Zayul County
()
or Zayü County
is a county in the Nyingchi Prefecture in the southeastern part of the Tibet Autonomous Region, China.

The historical Zayul region is marked by the basin of the Zayul River, with its two branches: Rongto Chu (or the western Zayul River) and Zayul Chu (or the eastern Zayul River). The two branches join together near the town of Rima. After the junction, the Zayul river enters India's Arunachal Pradesh where it is called Lohit.

The Zayul county borders India and Burma to the south and China's Yunnan province to the southeast. To the northeast lies the Pome County and to the northwest the Medog County. Its headquarters of the county is Kyigang, referred to as the Zayul Town .

In 1950, Zayul County was the epicenter of a devastating earthquake.

Geography 

Zayul County is located in an area of highly varying topography, lying just south of the Tibetan Plateau in the mountainous region east of the Himalayas where the Transhimalayas transition to the Hengduan Mountains. Specifically, the county straddles the southern parts of the Baxoila Range, the eastern parts of the Kangri Karpo mountains, and the eastern parts of the Mishmi Hills. The primary rivers are the Zayul River through the central parts of the county and Nu River (Salween) in the east.

Besides India, Burma, and Yunnan, it borders Zogang County to the north and Mêdog County to the southwest.

Climate 

Owing to its moderate elevation (for Tibet), Zayul County has a subtropical highland climate (Köppen Cwb), a rarity in Tibet, with mild and quite dry winters, and warm, rainy summers. The rainy season lasts from March to September, and June through August each average more than 20 days of rainfall per month. The frost-free period is 280 days annually. Its climate is well-suited to support a variety of agricultural and forestry products.

Environment
The central parts of Zayul County contain a large isolated section of the Northeastern Himalayan subalpine conifer forests throughout the Zayul River valley and its tributaries.  The highland areas of Zayul contain Eastern Himalayan alpine shrub and meadows.  The eastern parts of the county are classified as Nujiang Langcang Gorge alpine conifer and mixed forests.  There are, however, extremely dry areas within the Nu Valley in Zayul that support mostly succulents.

Gecko Hemiphyllodactylus zayuensis, named after Zayul, is only known from the county.

Administrative divisions
The Zayul County has administration over three towns and three townships:
Zayul Town  - County seat,
Xiachayu (Lower Zayul) 
Shangzayü (Upper Zayul) 
Goyul Township 
Golag Township 
Tsawarong Township 

The town of Rima , on the border with India's Arunachal Pradesh,  was once the headquarters of the Zayul region and referred to as the "Zayul Town".

There are also numerous villages scattered throughout the valleys in Zayü County administered by their respective towns or townships.  Puzang is part of Upper Zayul and Shaqiong is part of Lower Zayul.

Sino-Indian border dispute 
China claims nearly the entire Arunachal Pradesh as being part of Tibet, especially the Walong region in the Zayul River valley below Rima. The area was one of the theatres of the 1962 Sino-Indian War.

Notes

References

Bibliography

External links
 Zayul County, OpenStreetMap, retrieved 2 October 2022.
 Zayul river basin, OpenStreetMap, retrieved 2 October 2022.

Counties of Tibet
Nyingchi